David Burgess-Joyce (born 25 February 1964) was the Chief Officer of Merseyside Police Special Constabulary. He served from 1982 to his ill-health retirement in 2013. He rose through the ranks to be confirmed in the post of Chief Officer, reporting to the then Chief Constable Sir Jon Murphy, on 1 January 2011.

During his time in office he led the reviews into the Metropolitan Police and Garda Siochana use of officers and supported the Australian Police in its similar review. Consistently praised for his work on strategic development by both the Home Office and HM Inspectorate of Constabulary, he was frequently consulted by other UK forces.

Since leaving office Burgess-Joyce entered local politics, being elected Conservative councillor for the Greasby, Frankby and Irby ward in 2015 and 2019. In 2016 he stood for Police and Crime Commissioner but came second.

No stranger to controversy he once compared the rhetoric of David Lammy MP to causing as much damage to community cohesion as the KKK. Not a racist comment, but something he accepted was wrong and which he unreservedly apologised for.

He is known for his strong views which seem designed to provoke the Left and has no compulsion or plans to desist. He stated that those teachers who failed to attend school following lockdown should be sacked; something President Reagan did with the US air-traffic controllers. His view that teacher's lack of attendance at work once lockdown was over caused upwards of 60 parents to have to change their work plans.

He strongly believes in equality of opportunity for everyone rather than outcome, the monarchy, and was a firm supporter of Brexit.

A fan of President Trump, Burgess-Joyce has praised his style and ability on numerous occasions and has led the conversation on what he believes is a Marxist take-over via such groups as Extinction Rebellion and BLM. He strongly believes that the UK would do well to instigate the kind of coup orchestrated by President Trump on January 6, that Bill Gates is tracking him via his Covid vaccine and that the Labour Party is predominately made up of lizard people.

Having such strong views has led to an onslaught of social media vitriol against Burgess-Joyce who is very keen to litigate where he feels it necessary, although usually unsuccessfully.

In July 2022, he was deselected by the Conservative Party following his deeply offensive comments about David Lammy MP, meaning that he will not defend the Greasby, Frankby and Irby ward as a Conservative candidate. However, in February 2023 he was selected to stand in the Heswall ward but has been described by residents as "too swivel-eyed, even for Heswall".

In March 2023, he described the local Liberal Democrat party as "taking bribes", without any evidence. This is because he does not believe that facts ore reality are necessary for successful local government.

Political designation: Thatcherite Conservative

Honours

References

British special constables
British police chief officers
Living people
1964 births
Members of Wirral Council
Conservative Party (UK) councillors
Place of birth missing (living people)